The Suwon Baseball Stadium, also known as the Suwon kt wiz Park due to sponsorship reasons, is a baseball stadium in Suwon, South Korea. Since 2015, it has been the home of KBO club KT Wiz. The stadium has a capacity of 20,000, and is part of the Suwon Sports Complex.

History

The stadium was the home of the Hyundai Unicorns from 1989 to 2007. In 2013, the stadium was renovated and expanded.

See also 
Suwon Sports Complex
Suwon Gymnasium

External links 

Suwon Sports Complex official website 

Baseball venues in South Korea
Sports venues completed in 1989
Sports venues in Suwon
KT Wiz
1989 establishments in South Korea
20th-century architecture in South Korea